Translations of J. R. R. Tolkien's The Lord of the Rings have been made, with varying degrees of success, into dozens of languages from the original English. Tolkien, an expert in Germanic philology, scrutinized those that were under preparation during his lifetime, and made comments on early translations that reflect both the translation process and his work. To aid translators, and because he was unhappy with some choices made by early translators such as Åke Ohlmarks with his Swedish version, Tolkien wrote his Guide to the Names in The Lord of the Rings in 1967 (released publicly in 1975 in A Tolkien Compass, and in full in 2005, in The Lord of the Rings: A Reader's Companion).

Challenges to translation 

Because The Lord of the Rings purports to be a translation of the Red Book of Westmarch, with the English language in the translation purporting to represent the Westron of the original, translators need to imitate the complex interplay between English and non-English (Elvish) nomenclature in the book. An additional difficulty is the presence of proper names in Old English and Old Norse. Tolkien chose to use Old English for names and some words of the Rohirrim, for example, "Théoden", King of Rohan: his name is simply a transliteration of Old English þēoden, "king". Similarly, he used Old Norse for "external" names of his Dwarves, such as "Thorin Oakenshield": both Þorinn and Eikinskjaldi are Dwarf-names from the Völuspá.

The relation of such names to English, within the history of English, and of the Germanic languages more generally, is intended to reflect the relation of the purported "original" names to Westron. The Tolkien scholar Tom Shippey states that Tolkien began with the words and names that he wanted, and invented parts of Middle-earth to resolve the linguistic puzzle he had accidentally created by using different European languages for those of peoples in his legendarium.

Early translations 

The first translations of The Lord of the Rings to be prepared were those in Dutch (1956–7, Max Schuchart) and Swedish (1959–60, Åke Ohlmarks). Both took considerable liberties with their material, apparent already from the rendition of the title, In de Ban van de Ring "Under the Spell of the Ring" and Härskarringen "The Ruling Ring", respectively.

Most later translations, beginning with the Polish Władca Pierścieni in 1961, render the title more literally. Later non-literal title translations however include the Japanese  "Legend of the Ring", Finnish Taru Sormusten Herrasta "Legend of the Lord of the Rings", the first Norwegian translation Krigen om ringen "The War of the Ring", Icelandic Hringadróttinssaga "The Lord of the Rings' Saga", and West Frisian, Master fan Alle Ringen "Master of All Rings".

Tolkien in both the Dutch and the Swedish cases objected strongly while the translations were in progress, in particular regarding the adaptation of proper names. Despite lengthy correspondence, Tolkien did not succeed in convincing the Dutch translator of his objections, and was similarly frustrated in the Swedish case.

Dutch (Schuchart) 

Regarding the Dutch version of Max Schuchart, In de Ban van de Ring, Tolkien wrote

However, if one reads the Dutch version, little has changed except the names of certain characters, this to ensure that no reading difficulties emerge for Dutch speakers who don't understand English.
Schuchart's translation remains, as of 2008, the only authorized translation in Dutch. However, there is an unauthorized translation by E.J. Mensink-van Warmelo, dating from the late 1970s.
A revision of Schuchart's translation was initiated in 2003, but the publisher Uitgeverij M decided against publishing it.

Swedish

Ohlmarks 1959–1961 

Åke Ohlmarks was a prolific translator, who during his career besides Tolkien published Swedish versions of Shakespeare, Dante and the Qur'an. Tolkien intensely disliked Ohlmarks' translation of The Lord of the Rings (which Ohlmarks named Härskarringen, 'The Ruling Ring'), however, more so even than Schuchart's Dutch translation. Ohlmarks' translation remained the only one available in Swedish for forty years, and until his death in 1984, Ohlmarks remained impervious to the numerous complaints and calls for revision from readers.

After The Silmarillion was published in 1977, Christopher Tolkien consented to a Swedish translation only on the condition that Ohlmarks have nothing to do with it. After a fire at his home in 1982, Ohlmarks incoherently charged Tolkien fans with arson, and subsequently published the book Tolkien och den svarta magin (Tolkien and the black magic) - a book connecting Tolkien with "black magic" and Nazism.

Andersson and Olsson 2005 

Ohlmarks' translation was superseded only in 2005, by a new translation by Erik Andersson with poems interpreted by Lotta Olsson. The work was retitled Ringarnas herre, 'The Rings' Lord'.

German

Carroux 1969–1970 

As a reaction to his disappointment with the Dutch and Swedish translations, Tolkien wrote his Guide to the Names in The Lord of the Rings, gaining himself a larger influence on translations into other Germanic languages, namely Danish and German. Frankfurt-based Margaret Carroux qualified for the German version published by Klett-Cotta on basis of her translation of Tolkien's short story Leaf by Niggle, that she had translated solely to give him a sample of her work. In her preparation for The Lord of the Rings (Der Herr der Ringe), unlike Schluchart and Ohlmarks, Carroux even visited Tolkien in Oxford with a suitcase full of his published works and questions about them. Yet, mainly due to a cold that both Tolkien and his wife were going through at the time, the meeting was later described as inhospitable and 'chilly', Tolkien being 'harsh', 'taciturn' and 'severely ill'. Later correspondences with Carroux turned out to be much more encouraging with Tolkien being generally very pleased with Carroux's work, with the sole exception of the poems and songs, that would eventually be translated by poet Ebba-Margareta von Freymann.

On several instances Carroux departed from the literal, e.g. for the Shire. Tolkien endorsed the Gouw of the Dutch version and remarked that German Gau "seems to me suitable in Ger., unless its recent use in regional reorganization under Hitler has spoilt this very old word." Carroux decided that this was indeed the case, and opted for the more artificial Auenland "meadow-land" instead.

"Elf" was rendered with linguistic care as Elb, the plural Elves as Elben. The choice reflects Tolkien's suggestion:

The Elb chosen by Carroux instead of the suggested Alb is a construction by Jacob Grimm in his 1835 Teutonic Mythology. Grimm, like Tolkien, notes that German Elf is a loan from the English, and argues for the revival of the original German cognate, which survived in the adjective elbisch and in composed names like Elbegast. Grimm also notes that the correct plural of Elb would be Elbe, but Carroux does not follow in this and uses the plural Elben, denounced by Grimm as incorrect in his German Dictionary (s.v. Alb).

On many instances, though, the German version resorts to literal translations. Rivendell Tolkien considered as a particularly difficult case, and recommended to "translate by sense, or retain as seems best.", but Carroux opted for the literal Bruchtal. The name "Baggins" was rendered as Beutlin (containing the word Beutel meaning "bag").

Another case where Carroux translated the meaning rather than the actual words was the name of Shelob, formed from the pronoun she plus lob, a dialectal word for "spider" (according to Tolkien; the OED is only aware of its occurrence in Middle English). Tolkien gives no prescription; he merely notes that "The Dutch version retains Shelob, but the Swed. has the rather feeble Honmonstret ["she-monster"]." Carroux chose Kankra, an artificial feminine formation from dialectal German Kanker ('Daddy-longlegs', cognate to cancer).

Krege 2000 

In 2000, Klett-Cotta published a new translation of The Lord of the Rings by Wolfgang Krege, not as a replacement of the old one, which throughout the years had gained a loyal following, but rather as an accompaniment. The new version focuses more on the differences in linguistic style that Tolkien employed to set apart the more biblical prose and the high style of elvish and human 'nobility' from the more colloquial 1940s English spoken by the Hobbits, something that he thought Carroux's more unified version was lacking. Krege's translation met mixed reception, the general argument of critics being that he took too many liberties in modernising the language of the Hobbits with the linguistic style of late 90s German that not only subverted the epic style of the narrative as a whole but also went beyond the stylistic differences intended by Tolkien. Klett-Cotta has continued to offer and continuously republishes both translations. Yet, for the 2012 republication of Krege's version, his most controversial decisions were partly reverted.

Russian 

Interest in Russia awoke soon after the publication of The Lord of the Rings in 1955, long before the first Russian translation.
A first effort at publication was made in the 1960s, but in order to comply with literary censorship in Soviet Russia, the work was considerably abridged and transformed. The ideological danger of the book was seen in the "hidden allegory 'of the conflict between the individualist West and the totalitarian, Communist East'", while, ironically, Marxist readings in the west conversely identified Tolkien's anti-industrial ideas as presented in the Shire with primitive communism, in a struggle with the evil forces of technocratic capitalism.

Russian translations of The Lord of the Rings circulated as samizdat and were published only after the collapse of the Soviet Union, but then in great numbers; no less than ten official Russian translations appeared between 1990 and 2005. Tolkien fandom grew especially rapidly during the early 1990s at Moscow State University. Many unofficial and incomplete translations are in circulation. The first translation appearing in print was that by Kistyakovski and Muravyov (volume 1, published 1982).

Hebrew 

The first translation of The Lord of the Rings into Hebrew (שר הטבעות) was done by Canaanite movement member Ruth Livnit, aided by Uriel Ofek as the translator of the verse. The 1977 version was considered a unique book for the sort of Hebrew that was used therein, until it was revised by Dr. Emanuel Lottem according to the second English edition, although still under the name of the previous translators, with Lottem as merely "The editor".

The difference between the two versions is clear in the translation of names. Elves, for an example, were first translated as "בני לילית" (Bneyi Lilith, i.e. the "Children of Lilith") but in the new edition was transcribed in the form of "Elefs" maintained through Yiddish as "עלף". The change was made because "Bneyi Lilith" essentially relates with Babylonian-derived Jewish folklore character of Lilith, mother of all demons, an inappropriate name for Tolkien's Elves.
Since all seven appendices and part of the foreword were dropped in the first edition, the rules of transcript therein were not kept. In the New edition Dr. Lottem translated the appendices by himself, and transcribed names according to the instructions therein. Furthermore, the old translation was made without any connection to the rest of Tolkien's mythological context, not The Silmarillion nor even The Hobbit. Parts of the story relating to events mentioned in the above books were not understood and therefore either translated inaccurately, or even dropped completely.
There are also major inconsistencies in transcript or in repetitions of similar text within the story, especially in the verse.

Tolkien's Guide to the Names in The Lord of the Rings 

The Guide to the Names in The Lord of the Rings is a guideline on the nomenclature in The Lord of the Rings compiled by J. R. R. Tolkien in 1966 to 1967, intended for the benefit of translators, especially for translations into Germanic languages. The first translations to profit from the guideline were those into Danish (Ida Nyrop Ludvigsen) and German (Margaret Carroux), both appearing 1972.

Frustrated by his experience with the Dutch and Swedish translations, Tolkien asked that

With a view to the planned Danish translation, Tolkien decided to take action in order to avoid similar disappointments in the future. On 2 January 1967, he wrote to Otto B. Lindhardt, of the Danish publisher Gyldendals Bibliotek:

Photocopies of this "commentary" were sent to translators of The Lord of the Rings by Allen & Unwin from 1967. After Tolkien's death, it was published as Guide to the Names in The Lord of the Rings, edited by Christopher Tolkien in Jared Lobdell's A Tolkien Compass (1975).
Wayne G. Hammond and Christina Scull (2005) have newly transcribed and slightly edited Tolkien's typescript, and re-published it under the title of Nomenclature of The Lord of the Rings in their book The Lord of the Rings: A Reader's Companion.

Tolkien uses the abbreviations CS for "Common Speech, in original text represented by English", and LT for the target language of the translation. His approach is the prescription that if in doubt, a proper name should not be altered but left as it appears in the English original:

The names in English form, such as Dead Marshes, should in Tolkien's view be translated straightforwardly, while the names in Elvish should be left unchanged. The difficult cases are those names where

An example is Rivendell, the translation of Sindarin Imladris "Glen of the Cleft", or Westernesse, the translation of Númenor.
The list gives suggestions for "old, obsolescent, or dialectal words in the Scandinavian and German languages".

The Danish (Ludvigsen) and German (Carroux) translations were the only ones profiting from Tolkien's "commentary" to be published before Tolkien's death in 1973. Since then, new translations into numerous languages have continued to appear.

List of translations 

The number of languages into which Tolkien's works has been translated is subject to some debate since the Portuguese and Brazilian dialects of Portuguese are sometimes counted separately, as are the Nynorsk and Bokmål forms of Norwegian and Traditional and Simplified Chinese editions. Elrond's Library, as of its last updating in 2019, explicitly lists 87 translations in 57 languages for which translations of The Lord of the Rings exist.

Comparatively few translations appeared during Tolkien's lifetime: when he died on 2 September 1973, the Dutch, Swedish, Polish, Italian, Danish, German and French translations had been published completely, and the Japanese and Finnish ones in part. The Russian translations are a special case because many unpublished and unauthorized versions circulated in the 1970s and 1980s Soviet Union; these were gradually published from the 1990s onwards.

See also 

 Bibliography of J. R. R. Tolkien
 International reception of Tolkien
 Translations of The Hobbit

References

Bibliography 

 Wayne G. Hammond and Christina Scull, The Lord of the Rings: A Reader's Companion (2005), 750-782.
 Allan Turner, Translating Tolkien: Philological Elements in "The Lord of the Rings," Frankfurt: Peter Lang, 2005. . Duisburger Arbeiten zur Sprach– und Kulturwissenschaft no. 59.

External links 
 Complete list of translations to 2019 of The Lord of the Rings (with bibliographical details)

 
Lists of fantasy books